"I'd Do Anything for Love (But I Won't Do That)" is a song written by Jim Steinman, and recorded by American rock singer Meat Loaf featuring Lorraine Crosby. The song was released in August 1993 as the first single from his sixth album, Bat Out of Hell II: Back into Hell (1993). The last six verses feature Crosby, who was credited only as "Mrs. Loud" in the album notes. She does not appear in the video, in which her vocals are lip-synched by Dana Patrick. Meat Loaf promoted the single with American singer Patti Russo.

The power ballad was a commercial success, reaching number one in 28 countries. The single was certified platinum in the United States and became Meat Loaf's first and only number-one and top ten single on the Billboard Hot 100 chart. It also became Meat Loaf's first and only number-one single on the UK Singles Chart, and was the best-selling single of 1993 in the United Kingdom. The song earned Meat Loaf a Grammy Award for Best Rock Vocal Performance, Solo.

Music and lyrics
The timings in this article refer to the original album version. There are many shorter single and radio edits.

The song opens with a guitar played to sound like a revving motorcycle. Roy Bittan's piano begins to play along with the guitars and drums. The vocals begin at the 1:50 point. The opening vocals are accompanied by piano and backing vocals. The song then becomes much louder as the band, predominantly piano, plays the main melody for twenty seconds. An instrumental section follows the first verse and chorus, lasting over 45 seconds, with piano playing the title melody, accompanied by guitar and wordless background vocals by Todd Rundgren, Rory Dodd and Kasim Sulton. The lead vocals recommence with another verse. The phrase "sex, drugs and rock 'n' roll" was changed to "Some days I just pray to the god of sex and drums and rock and roll" on the recording, although Meat Loaf would occasionally sing the original phrase in concert.

The lyrics "I'd do anything for love, but I won't do that" were first used in the song "Getting So Excited" (written by Alan Gruner), recorded by Bonnie Tyler in the album Faster Than the Speed of Night, which was produced by Steinman.

Duet coda
At the 9:28 point, the song transforms into a duet coda. The structure of the verses remains, but the woman now asks what the man would do. He answers in the affirmative for the first four sections. The song's tone changes for the final two sections, in which the woman, Lorraine Crosby on the original recorded version, predicts that the man would eventually do things to upset her and their relationship. Both times, he denies it.

Perceived ambiguity of "that"
Meat Loaf claimed that the question, "What is 'that'?" was one of the most popular questions he would be asked. In his 1998 VH1 Storytellers special, he explained it on stage using a blackboard and a pointer. Meat Loaf believed that the lyrics were unambiguous, but Steinman predicted that they would cause confusion. 

Each verse identifies things the man would do for love (such as "I'd run right into hell and back"), followed by a promise of something he will not do (such as "I'll never forget the way you feel right now"). This is followed by the title lyrics, which repeat the pattern. Each mention of "that" is thus a reference to the particular promise made earlier in the same verse. At the song's conclusion, the woman predicts: "You'll see that it's time to move on", and "You'll be screwing around." To each of these, he emphatically responds, "I won't do that!"

An early episode of the VH1 program Pop-up Video commented, "Exactly what Meat Loaf won't do for love remains a mystery to this day." A reviewer writing for AllMusic commented that "The lyrics build suspense by portraying a romance-consumed lover who pledges to do anything in the name of love except 'that,' a mysterious thing that he will not specify." Frank O'day says the lyrics provide "an enlightening example of how listeners project their own thoughts, values, and concerns onto the meaning of the song with misconstrued lyrics."

Recording

English singer Lorraine Crosby sang the other part of the duet. She and her partner Stuart Emerson had moved to Los Angeles to work with Steinman, who became their manager and secured them a contract with Meat Loaf's label MCA. While visiting the company's studios on Sunset Boulevard, Crosby was asked to provide guide vocals for Meat Loaf, who was recording the song. Crosby recalls, "In I went and sang it twice and I never thought anything more of it until six months later when I got a phone call saying, 'Would you mind if we used your vocals?'" As Crosby had recorded her part as guide vocals, she received no royalties from the song.

Cher, Melissa Etheridge and Bonnie Tyler had been considered for the role. Tyler, who described Crosby as "a great friend of mine from Newcastle", said: "Meat Loaf was naughty, really: he gave her no acknowledgement on the album but I think her part really made that song."

Critical reception
Critical reaction was mixed. AllMusic said that "Meat Loaf sells the borderline-campy lyrics with a full-throated vocal whose stirring sense of conviction brings out the heart hidden behind the clever phrases." Larry Flick from Billboard wrote that the song "has Mr. Loaf's emotionally charged vocal fronting a mammoth mix (and what sounds like a cast of thousands). Cohort Steinman gives it his all here, providing epic power chords, angelic backing choruses, a romance-laden duet with fellow MCA signee "Mrs. Loud", and anthemic pace changes calculated to raise every lighter in the arena." He also described it as "a glorious exercise in rock'n'roll excess." Alan Jones from Music Week gave it four out of five and named it Pick of the Week, commenting, "This "edited" epic still checks in at nearly eight minutes and inciudes ail the bombast you would expect whenever Meat and Jim Steinman meet. It's way over the top, but that's part of its appeal and, as such, is destined to become a very large hit." Matt Birkbeck from Rolling Stone called it a "guilty pleasure".

British adventurer Bear Grylls cites this song as his inspiration to apply for selection into the SAS: "Enthusiasm and determination count for so much more than skills, brains or qualifications... and all this expressed itself to me through Meatloaf's song!".

Performance
The song reached number one in the charts in 28 countries. In most countries, it was Meat Loaf's first and only number one solo single. It was number one in the US for five weeks and sold over 1.4 million copies there. In the UK, it topped the singles chart, and at seven minutes and 52 seconds, "I'd Do Anything for Love" becoming the longest song on top there since The Beatles' hit "Hey Jude". This was then broken when Oasis released their 1998 single "All Around the World", clocking in at 9 minutes and 38 seconds.

In the United Kingdom, this was the biggest hit of 1993, selling 723,000 copies in 1993. As a result of its success, "Bat Out of Hell" was reissued in the UK, this time reaching the top ten (which it did not achieve on its first release in 1979), meaning Meat Loaf achieved the rare feat of having two singles in the UK top ten at the same time.

Meat Loaf won a Grammy Award for Best Rock Vocal Performance, Solo for the song. In Germany, the song is the seventh best-selling pop hymn ever.

Music video
Michael Bay directed the accompanying music video for "I'd Do Anything for Love (But I Won't Do That)". He also directed the videos for "Objects in the Rear View Mirror May Appear Closer than They Are" and "Rock and Roll Dreams Come Through", also from Bat Out of Hell II. Filming took place in Los Angeles County, California in July 1993; the opening chase was filmed at Chávez Ravine, with the interior mansion scenes filmed at Greystone Mansion in Beverly Hills. The cinematographer was Daniel Pearl, particularly known for filming The Texas Chain Saw Massacre in 1973. Pearl says that this video "is one of my personal all-time favorite projects... I think the cinematography is pure, and it tells a story about the song."

The video is based on Beauty and the Beast and The Phantom of the Opera. Bob Keane did Meat Loaf's make-up, which took up to two hours to apply. The make-up was designed to be simple and scary, yet "with the ability to make him sympathetic." 
The shoot went over budget, and was filmed in  heat, across four days. According to one executive, it "probably had the budget of Four Weddings and a Funeral." It is the abridged seven-minute version, rather than the twelve-minute album version.

The actress in the video, Dana Patrick, is miming to Crosby's vocals; she did the same for Patti Russo's vocals in the 1995 song "I'd Lie for You (And That's the Truth)". According to the captions aired on Pop-Up Video, Patrick received several offers for record deals after the video aired, from executives who assumed she was actually singing in the video.

Synopsis

The story begins with the opening credits saying: "I have travelled across the universe through the years to find her. Sometimes going all the way is just a start." We then see "The Beast" character – a deformed man portrayed by Meat Loaf, on a motorbike being chased by police officers and a helicopter. As the chase continues into night, the Beast passes into a graveyard and into what appears to be a very ornate mausoleum, hiding from his pursuers. He mournfully examines his deformed hands and features. As the officers enter and examine the mausoleum, he crashes through the wall with his motorbike and accidentally knocks down a police officer (whose shotgun goes off): this causes one of the chandeliers on the ceiling to fall and kill the officer.

In desperation, the Beast flees into the nearby woods where he comes across a beautiful woman bathing/cooling herself by a fountain. The woman appears to be in sunny daylight, while the rest of the woods and castle clearly show that it is night-time. The woman looks into a mirror and glimpses the Beast watching her. She turns and he flees leaving only an amulet hanging on a branch. The woman picks it up and pursues him.

As she approaches the castle, the Beast is watching her movements through the reflection of his drink. As she comes into the castle, the Beast hurriedly removes himself. The woman sits in his chair and rests by the fire. The Beast watches her from his hall of mirrors and contemplates approaching her but is ashamed of his appearance. She later is seen having a bath, interspersed with the police officers finding the dead officer's body and preparing to raid the castle. She is later seen trying to sleep while being seduced by three vampy women, while the Beast sits in a chair (a reference to Dracula and the Brides). The Beast leaves the room and, seeing his reflection, begins to smash up the mirrors. The woman, hearing the noise, comes out and follows him into a presumable living room. The Beast observes her from above and levitates the chair she is sitting on.

The Beast, then hearing the officers are near, moves away, and pulls the chair back down, breaking a lamp. The two run away and the woman removes the Beast's hood so she can look at him clearly. She accepts him and caresses his face while they embrace. As they pull away, the Beast is returned to his human form, and the two disappear just before the police catch them. The woman and the transformed Beast finally ride off into the sunrise on his motorbike.

Track listings
The single cover is a cropped version of the painting Leavetaking by fantasy illustrator Michael Whelan, who also painted the Bat Out of Hell II cover.

Charts

Weekly charts

Year-end charts

Decade-end charts

Certifications

References

1990s ballads
1993 singles
1993 songs
Billboard Hot 100 number-one singles
Dutch Top 40 number-one singles
European Hot 100 Singles number-one singles
Grammy Award for Best Solo Rock Vocal Performance
Rock ballads
Irish Singles Chart number-one singles
MCA Records singles
Male–female vocal duets
Meat Loaf songs
Music videos directed by Michael Bay
Number-one singles in Australia
Number-one singles in Austria
Number-one singles in Belgium
Number-one singles in Denmark
Number-one singles in Germany
Number-one singles in Iceland
Number-one singles in New Zealand
Number-one singles in Norway
Number-one singles in Sweden
Number-one singles in Switzerland
RPM Top Singles number-one singles
Song recordings produced by Jim Steinman
Songs written by Jim Steinman
UK Singles Chart number-one singles
Virgin Records singles
Song recordings with Wall of Sound arrangements